Andrea Arnaboldi and Antonio Šančić were the defending champions but only Šančić chose to defend his title, partnering Marin Draganja. Šančić lost in the first round to Julian Knowle and Jonathan Marray.

Evgeny Donskoy and Mikhail Elgin won the title after defeating Knowle and Marray 6–4, 3–6, [11–9] in the final.

Seeds

Draw

References
 Main Draw

Open de Rennes - Doubles
Open de Rennes